Meditation is a technique to train attention and awareness, achieve mental clearity, and reach an emotionally calm, stable state.

Meditation may also refer to:

Forms 
 Buddhist meditation
 Christian meditation
 Daoist meditation
 Hinduism meditation
 Jain meditation
 Jewish meditation
 Meditation in the Ravidasi Faith
 Monastic silence
 Transcendental Meditation
 Sensual Meditation
 Sikh meditation
 Sahaja Yoga meditation
 Heartfulness Meditation (Sahaj Marg)

Literature 
 Meditation (writing), a discourse that expresses an author's reflections, or that guides others in contemplation
 Meditations, a series of personal writings by Marcus Aurelius, Roman Emperor 161–180 CE, setting forth his ideas on Stoic philosophy
 Meditations on First Philosophy, a philosophical treatise written by René Descartes and first published in 1641
 Meditation, later published as Passage Meditation, a 1978 book by Eknath Easwaran

Music 
 The Meditations, a Jamaican reggae group
 "Méditation" (Thaïs), an symphonic intermezzo from the 1894 opera Thaïs by Jules Massenet
 Méditations sur le mystère de la Sainte Trinité, a composition by Olivier Messiaen

Albums
 Meditations (Kataklysm album), 2018
 Meditation, classical album by Elina Garanca, 2014
 Meditation (Toshiko Akiyoshi Quartet album), 1971
Meditation (George Coleman and Tete Montoliu album), 1977
 Meditation: Solo Guitar, a live album by Joe Pass, recorded in 1992 and released posthumously in 2002
 Meditation (Bobby Miller album), released 2003
 Meditations (John Coltrane album), 1965
 Meditations (Elmo Hope album), 1955
 Meditations (Mal Waldron album), 1972

Songs
 "Meditation" (Antônio Carlos Jobim song), a bossa nova song composed by "Tom" Jobim and Newton Mendonça and English lyrics by Norman Gimbel
"Meditation", song by Booker T. & the M.G.'s, written B. T. Jones, B-side of "Slum Baby" 1969

Art 
 Meditation, an 1885 painting by William-Adolphe Bouguereau
 Meditation, a 1918 painting by Alexej von Jawlensky

See also
 Brain activity and meditation
 Dhyana in Hinduism
 Divine Meditations (disambiguation)
 Mantra
 Meditation in popular culture
 Muraqaba
 Research on meditation
 Samadhi
 Simran